The Legendre River (in French: rivière Legendre) is a tributary of the Felton River which flows into the Baie Sauvage to the south of Grand lac Saint François which constitutes the head lake of the Saint-François River.

The course of the Legendre River crosses the territories of the municipalities of Milan and Stornoway, in the Le Granit Regional County Municipality (MRC), in the administrative region of Estrie, on the South Shore of the St. Lawrence River, in Quebec, Canada.

Geography 

The main neighboring hydrographic slopes of the "Legendre river" are:
 north side: Felton River, Grand lac Saint François;
 east side: Felton River, Noire River;
 south side: Blanche River, La Loutre brook, McLeod brook;
 west side: Caron stream, Rouge River.

The Legendre River has its source on the northern slope of a mountain (summit at ) of Milan. This source is located in a forest zone north of route 214.

From its source, the river flows over:
  west;
  towards the north, up to the south shore of Petit lac Legendre that the current crosses towards the north, along its full length;
  north, up to the municipal boundary between Milan and Saint-Romain;
  north, to a stream (coming from the west);
  towards the northeast, up to the outlet (coming from the west) of Lake Legendre;
  north-east, winding through Parc national de Frontenac, to its mouth.

Toponymy 
The toponym "Rivière Legendre" was officially registered on December 5, 1968, at the Commission de toponymie du Québec.

See also 
 List of rivers of Quebec

References 

Le Granit Regional County Municipality
Rivers of Estrie